Whittemore-Prescott Area Schools is a public school district in the U.S. state of Michigan serving pre-kindergarten through 12th grade. The district draws its approximately 745 students from the city of Whittemore and the townships of Burleigh, Reno, and Sherman in Iosco County, Clayton and Mason townships in Arenac County, and the village of Prescott and the townships of Logan, Mills, and Richland in Ogemaw County.

The district includes Whittemore-Prescott Early Childhood Center (pre-K housed at the elementary school), Whittemore-Prescott Elementary School (K-6), Whittemore-Prescott Jr/Sr High School (7-12).

External links
Iosco Regional Educational Service Agency
Whittemore-Prescott Area Schools

School districts in Michigan
Education in Arenac County, Michigan
Education in Iosco County, Michigan
Education in Ogemaw County, Michigan